Maa Iddari Katha is a 1977 Indian Telugu-language action-drama film directed by Nandamuri Ramesh. It stars N. T. Rama Rao, Manjula and Jaya Prada, with music composed by Chakravarthy.

Plot

Cast 

N. T. Rama Rao as Satyam & Viswam
Manjula as Geeta
Jaya Prada as Seeta
Rao Gopala Rao
Satyanarayana
Allu Ramalingaiah
Raja Babu
Prabhakar Reddy
Ramana Murthy
Mukkamala
Mada
Sarathi
Kakarala
Pandari Bai
Roja Ramani as Chandini
Halam

Soundtrack 
Music composed by Chakravarthy.

References

External links 

1970s action drama films
1970s Telugu-language films
Films scored by K. Chakravarthy
Indian action drama films